Chubb Fire & Security Ltd is a British firm specialised in fire protection and security systems, and is a subsidiary of APi Group Corporation (NYSE: APG).

History
The company was founded by Charles and Jeremiah Chubb, who patented their Chubb detector lock in 1818. The company won a government competition for a lock which could not be opened other than by its own key.

In 1835, the company produced its first Chubb safe at its factory in Wolverhampton, UK and, in the second half of the 19th century, the company expanded into the United States, and produced a time lock that was fitted to bank vaults across the country. In the 1800s, Chubb gained some important customers such as the Duke of Wellington and the Bank of England.

Over the next one hundred years, the company turned out more than 2.5m locks. By the 1940s, Chubb expanded its operations in 17 countries. From being a single company manufacturing specialized security products it turned into a broad-based group of companies covering not only many aspects of security but fire protection as well.

The company went on to acquire a number of rival firms including Chatwood-Milner Ltd. (1958), Burgot Alarms Ltd and Rely-a-Bell (1962), Read and Campbell Limited (1964), Josiah Parkes and Sons Ltd. (1965) and The Pyrene Company Limited (1967). It was bought by Racal Electronics in August 1984, from which it was demerged in September 1992, before being acquired by Williams Holdings in February 1997. as the latter company sought to build a security-focused conglomerate. Chubb was again demerged in July 2000.

In August 2000, Chubb sold Chubb Locks, its lock and safe making unit, to Assa Abloy, and concentrated on security systems such as door access and CCTV systems. In May 2002, Chubb held intensive acquisitions talks with Sweden-based Securitas AB, the world's biggest security services business. After 18 months of negotiations, the talks were called off on the grounds that the deal would not be "financially attractive" to either company's shareholders.

In Australia, Chubb Security bought MSS Security in 1996, but then sold it to Security and Intelligence Services in 2008.

In April 2003, Chubb was acquired for £622m by United Technologies Corporation. In March 2007, UTC bought Initial Fire and Security, the security arm of Rentokil Initial and proceeded to merge the business and its assets with Chubb in UTC Climate, Controls & Security. In December 2013, Chubb's Australian cash in transit business was sold to Prosegur.

In 2020, Chubb was spun off with the rest of UTC Climate, Controls & Security into a separate company, Carrier Global. On 3 January 2022 it was announced that Carrier Global had sold the business to APi Group for US$ 3.1 billion.

Brands
Sicli (Secours Immédiat Contre L’Incendie)
Delta Security Solutions
Counterforce
SMC (Security Monitoring Centers)
Quell
VitalCall

See also
Chubb Fire
Chubb Locks
Read and Campbell Limited
Minimax Limited
Rampart Engineering
The Pyrene Company Limited

References

External links

Official site

United Technologies
Business services companies established in 1818
Security companies of the United Kingdom
Fire detection and alarm companies
Manufacturing companies of the United Kingdom
Service companies of the United Kingdom
Manufacturing companies established in 1818
Companies formerly listed on the London Stock Exchange
British companies established in 1818
Racal
1818 establishments in England
2003 mergers and acquisitions
Ashford, Surrey
Companies based in Surrey
British subsidiaries of foreign companies